South Muddy Township is one of eleven townships in Jasper County, Illinois, USA.  As of the 2010 census, its population was 340 and it contained 137 housing units.

Geography

Adjacent townships
 North Muddy Township (north)
 Wade Township (northeast)
 Smallwood Township (east)
 Denver Township, Richland County (southeast)
 Pixley Township, Clay County (south)
 Bible Grove Township, Clay County (west)
 Lucas Township, Effingham County (northwest)

Cemeteries
The township contains these ten cemeteries: Abbott, Devore, Foster, Freeman, Fulks, Headyville, Pleasant Valley, South Muddy, Worthey and Worthy.

Demographics

School districts
 Dieterich Community Unit School District 30
 Jasper County Community Unit School District 1

Political districts
 Illinois' 19th congressional district
 State House District 108
 State Senate District 54

References
 
 United States Census Bureau 2007 TIGER/Line Shapefiles
 United States National Atlas

External links
 City-Data.com
 Illinois State Archives

Townships in Jasper County, Illinois
1859 establishments in Illinois
Populated places established in 1859
Townships in Illinois